A marriage proposal planner is a professional event coordinator who specializes in planning marriage proposals.  A proposal planner is a relatively new profession in the wedding industry.  Proposal planners suggest marriage proposal ideas, scout proposal locations, negotiate rates with vendors, draw up contracts, hire photographers, create romantic setups, acquire permits, and help clients choose engagement rings. Proposal planners interview the proposer and ask questions about the couple.  They then use those answers to create a unique proposal idea.

The mass media and social media are partly responsible for the emergence of proposal planners.  There are fancy proposals on TV, and women's expectations are rising. Men have trouble meeting those expectations without some help.

References

External links
 Wedding Proposals Go From Private Moments to Public Spectacles, Washington Post, 27 December 2013
 Interview with the founder of a proposal planning company, Wedding Daily, 20 November 2014
 The woman who can persuade your man to make a decent proposal, Evening Standard, 30 October 2014
 BBC World News – Proposal Planning, BBC World News, 14 February 2014
 Quit your job become a...proposal planner, Time Out, 11 July 2016
 The world's most outrageous marriage proposals, The Telegraph, 17 November 2016

Marriage
Wedding industry
Engagement
Pre-wedding